The Electrifying Aretha Franklin is the second studio album by American singer Aretha Franklin, released on March 19, 1962 by Columbia Records. The album which is also known under its working title The Incomparable Aretha Franklin, was recorded at Columbia Recording Studios, 799 Seventh Avenue, New York. It was produced by John Hammond and arranged by Richard Wess.

Track listing

Side one
"You Made Me Love You" (Joe McCarthy, James Vincent Monaco)  2:19
"I Told You So" (John Leslie McFarland)  2:44
"Rock-a-Bye Your Baby With a Dixie Melody" (Sam M. Lewis, Jean Schwartz, Joe Young)  2:24
"Nobody Like You" (James Cleveland)  2:23
"Exactly Like You" (Jimmy McHugh, Dorothy Fields)  2:36
"It's So Heartbreakin'" (John Leslie McFarland)  2:39

Side two
"Rough Lover" (John Leslie McFarland)  2:48
"Blue Holiday" (Willie Denson, Luther Dixon)  2:53
"Just for You" (Joe Bailey, John Leslie McFarland)  2:20
"That Lucky Old Sun (Just Rolls Around Heaven All Day)" (Haven Gillespie, Harry Beasley Smith)  3:20
"I Surrender, Dear" (Harry Barris, Gordon Clifford)  2:46
"Ac-Cent-Tchu-Ate the Positive" (Harold Arlen, Johnny Mercer)  2:18

Bonus tracks on reissues
"Introduction To Hard Times" 0:31
"Hard Times (No One Knows Better Than I)" 3:08
"When They Ask About You" 2:59
"Operation Heartbreak" 2:59

Mono mixes
"I Surrender, Dear" 2:46
"Rough Lover" 2:47
"Kissin' By The Mistletoe" (Also appears on An All-Star Christmas, CL 1699) 2:22

Personnel
Aretha Franklin – vocals, piano
John H. Hammond – producer, personal supervisor

References

Aretha Franklin albums
1962 albums
Albums produced by John Hammond (producer)
Columbia Records albums